The Gardener may refer to:

 The Gardener (1912 film), a Swedish silent film
 The Gardener (2012 film), an Iranian documentary film
 The Gardener, a 2021 action film starring Gary Daniels
 The Gardener (ballad), a Child ballad
 "The Gardener" (story), a 1925 short story by Rudyard Kipling
 The Gardener (book), a collection of poems by Rabindranath Tagore

See also
 Gardener (disambiguation)
 Gardening